Christian Petroni is an American celebrity chef and restaurateur. He came to prominence in 2018 as the joint winner of the fourteenth season of the Food Network television series Food Network Star (along with Jess Tom).

In 2020, 2021, and 2022 he has participated in the culinary competition reality television series Guy Fieri's Tournament of Champions (Food Network), seasons 1-3.

References

External links
 
 
 

American television chefs
Date of birth missing (living people)
Food Network chefs
Food Network Star winners
Living people
American male chefs
Year of birth missing (living people)
People from the Bronx